Paul "Silky" Jones (born 19 November 1966 in Sheffield, England), is former World Boxing Champion, known as Silky for his quickness, truly unpredictable skills and defensive prowess. He has a professional record of 31-12-1(15 KOs) in the welterweight, light-middleweight, middleweight, and super middleweight divisions. He defeated rugged American Verno Phillips for the Light Middleweight World Championship on 22 November 1995 and was stripped of the title in February 1996, Philips would go on to achieve World Championship status another three times.

Early years 
Jones turned pro in 1986, aged 20 winning his first professional bout against Paul Gillings. Paul then had 4 more fights before moving to Toronto (Canada) to gain some top experience where he had 3 winning bouts including a stunning 3rd-round KO at the hands of Tony Collier. Paul then returned to the UK and had 8 more fights against respectable fighters before winning his first title against Jason Rowe. After the fight Jones was quoted as being happy for winning the title but said he wound never defend it as he was going on to bigger and better things. On 14 April Jones won the WBO's Intercontinental title against Damien Denny, winning him the "KO of the year award". This then placed Jones as number 2 in the WBO rankings. Jones then defended this title twice. Jones was in the form of his life and was unbeaten for more the 3 years.

Capturing the Light Middleweight title 
Next up was what he had been waiting for; a shot at the champion. Jones went into the fight the heavy underdog but surprised the boxing world by dominated the fight capturing the WBO Light Middleweight title in 1995 with a majority decision win over Future IBF Light Middle Weight Champ and future IBHOF Champion Verno Phillips. With the win, Jones became the first British-born Light Middleweight World Champion. "Freddie King" (Paul's trainer) said after the fight he "Showed glimpses of absolute greatness and produced a great fight". Jones joined close friend and boxer Naseem Hamed as Sheffield's second world champion at the time and who was also ringside for the fight he said "Silkys's done the business tonight what a fight I knew he would win but not so easily".

Jones had become one of four world champions, from no one wanting to fight him to being world champion in the space of 6 months. Many Great fighters wanted to fight him especially Winky Wright (who later picked up Jones' title on the way to becoming Undisputed Light Middleweight World Champion) The plan was for Jones to defend his WBO title against Bronco Banyon McKart of Bob Arum's Top Rank promotions. Both parties had a verbal agreement for the bout to be staged either in the UK or America. Many did say Jones's style would have been perfect for this big fight but unfortunately this did not materialise however Jones did go on to win the WBC Super Middle Weight International World Title. Jones' last fight was a points decision over the future EBU–EE Super Middleweight champion Kreshnik Qato. Jones retired in 2002 with a record of 31-12-1.

WBO controversy 

In late 2014 it came to light via social media that Paul Silky Jones had never received his actual title belt from the World Boxing Organisation. Boxing fans began a trending campaign on Twitter with the hash tag #GetSilkyHisBelt. A very surprised Paul 'Silky' Jones was finally awarded his belt in Doncaster at a non-existent event staged by former trainer Ian Allcock and John Sheppard on 10 July 2015, after 20 years of fighting against the WBO and British Boxing Board of Control who denied his existence, retracted statements, and tried to charge him for the belt on more than one occasion. The belt arrived in England while Paul was on social media Tweeting support for world-famous Floyd Mayweather after his recent rift with the WBO.

Junior middleweight

Championships and accomplishments 

World Boxing Organization
WBO Light Middleweight Championship
WBO Inter-Continental Light Middleweight Championship
 1995 World Boxing Organization Fighter of the Year
 1995 World Boxing Organization KO of the year.
World Boxing Council
WBC International Super Middleweight Championship
Commonwealth
Commonwealth Middleweight Championship
World records set in 2011- first ever boxer to commentate on a live boxing fight via YouTube

See also 

 List of WBO world champions

References

External links 
 Career boxing record

1966 births
English male boxers
Living people
World Boxing Organization champions
Welterweight boxers
Sportspeople from Sheffield
People educated at King Ecgbert School